Theodore Eliopoulos (November 14, 1936 – November 30, 2010), known as Ted Sorel, was an American actor whose numerous credits included Guiding Light, Law & Order and Star Trek: Deep Space Nine. He also appeared in film productions, including the science fiction-horror film From Beyond (1986) as the villainous, mutating Dr. Edward Pretorius, and the horror film sequel Basket Case 2 (1990).

Life and career
Sorel was born in 1936 in San Francisco, California, the son of Maria (née Piccoulas) and Vassily Eliopoulos, a candy maker. He later adopted the professional name of Ted Sorel. His family had originally immigrated to the United States from their village of Kyparissi, Laconia, in Greece. Sorel would later renovate his grandfather's home in Kyparissi during his life.  He received his bachelor's degree from the University of the Pacific in Stockton, California.

Sorel resided in Katonah, New York, for much of his acting career. He died after a long illness at the Lillian Booth Actors' Home in Englewood, New Jersey, on November 30, 2010, at the age of 74.

Family
Ted was the nephew of the movie makeup artist Jack Pierce. He was survived by his wife, the actress Jacqueline Coslow (the daughter of the late actress Esther Muir and late composer Sam Coslow); two children and a granddaughter.

Filmography

References

External links

1936 births
2010 deaths
American male stage actors
American male film actors
American male television actors
University of the Pacific (United States) alumni
American people of Greek descent
Male actors from San Francisco
People from Katonah, New York